Obi were a British indie-pop group. Their debut mini-album, The Magic Land of Radio, had eight tracks and was released in 2002. They followed up with a full-time album, Diceman Lopez, produced by Hugh Jones in 2004. It contains material ranged from Post-Britpop to folk-rock and country to Gypsy and tejano music stylisations. That year they also appeared on the Acoustic Stage at the Glastonbury Festival.

The band's single Somewhere Nicer, taken from The Magic Land of Radio, was used in British television commercials for Haven and British Holidays in 2008 and DFS Furniture in 2018.

The band consisted of Damian Katkhuda, Dom Hazlehurst, Tom Worsley, and Ben Kempton.

Discography

Albums
The Magic Land of Radio (2002)
Diceman Lopez (2004)

Singles and EPs
"Big Sky EP" (2002)
"What's In A Name" (2002)
"Somewhere Nicer" (2002)
"To Some Folk" (2003)
"Creatures" (2004)

References

 The band's website as of mid-2003, at www.archive.org: https://web.archive.org/web/20030604040858/http://www.obitunes.com/news.htm
 The band's website as of early 2004, at www.archive.org: https://web.archive.org/web/20030604040858/http://www.obitunes.com/news.htm

External links
 http://www.obitunes.com/ is a holding page as of 2009.

English indie rock groups
British indie pop groups